Pieces of Me is a 2012 French comedy film directed by Nolwenn Lemesle.

Cast 
 Zabou Breitman as Christine
 Tchéky Karyo as Edern
 Adèle Exarchopoulos as Erell
 Adélaïde Leroux as Sarah
 Bruno Lochet as Bob

References

External links 

2012 comedy-drama films
2012 films
French comedy-drama films
2010s French-language films
2010s French films